Spin field may refer to:

 Spinor field, assignment of a spinor to every point in space, used in quantum mechanics and quantum field theory.
 A kind of Torsion field, used in pseudophysics.